Coopers Shoot is a locality in Byron Shire of the Northern Rivers region in New South Wales, Australia. At the 2021 Census, its population was 409, compared to the 2016 population of 265.

References

Towns in New South Wales
Northern Rivers